Lobodontulus is a genus of beetle in the family Carabidae. The only species in the genus is Lobodontulus mirei.

References

Lebiinae